Religion in Africa is multifaceted and has been a major influence on art, culture and philosophy. Today, the continent's various populations and individuals are mostly adherents of Christianity, Islam, and to a lesser extent several traditional African religions. In Christian or Islamic communities, religious beliefs are also sometimes characterized with syncretism with the beliefs and practices of traditional religions.

Traditional African religions

Africa encompasses a wide variety of traditional beliefs. Although religious customs are sometimes shared by many local societies, they are usually unique to specific populations or geographic regions. All traditional African religions are united by a shared animistic core with special importance to ancestor worship.

According to Dr J Omosade Awolalu, The "olden" in this context means indigenous, that which is foundational, handed down from generation to generation, meant as to be upheld and practised today and forevermore. A heritage from the past, yet not treated as a thing of the past but that which connects the past with the present and the present with eternity.

Often spoken of in the terms of a singularity, deliberate; yet conscious of the fact that Africa is a large continent with multitudes of nations who have complex cultures, innumerable languages and myriad dialects.

West African
The essence of this school of thought is based mainly on oral transmission; that which is written in people's hearts, minds, oral history, customs, temples and religious functions. It has no founders or leaders like Gautama Buddha, Jesus, or Muhammed. It has no missionaries or the intent to propagate or to proselytise. Some of the African traditional religions are those of the Serer of Senegal, the Yoruba and Igbo of Nigeria, and the Akan of Ghana and the Ivory Coast, and the Bono of Ghana and Ivory Coast. The western coast is also consisted of the Yoruba and Anglican religion of syncretism. The religion of the Gbe peoples (mostly the Ewe and Fon) of Benin, Togo and Ghana is called Vodun and is the main source for similarly named religions in the diaspora, such as Louisiana Voodoo, Haitian Vodou, Cuban Vodú, Dominican Vudú and Brazilian Vodum.

East Africans and Horners
Some distinctions between West African and East or Horn African traditional religion often includes considering the supernatural and natural or tangible as being one and the same, and using this stance to incorporate divination. Clergymen from this region who would historically catechize to the masses was often referred to as waganga. Another distinction of East African and Horners is the greater prevalence of prophets within the oral traditionas and other forms of generational transmissions of traditional African religion.

The most prominent indigenous deity among Cushitic Horners is Waaq, which continues to be manifested into the modern era with religions such as Waaqeffanna and Waaqism. According to the author Lugira, the Traditional African religions are the only religions "that can claim to have originated in Africa. Other religions found in Africa have their origins in other parts of the world."<ref>Lugira, Aloysius M., African Traditional Religions (New York: Chelsea House, 2009), p. 36 [in] Varghese, Roy Abraham, Christ Connection: How the World Religions Prepared the Way for the Phenomenon of Jesus, Paraclete Press (2011), p. 1935,   (Retrieved 7 May 2019)</ref>

Abrahamic religions
The majority of Africans are adherents of Christianity or Islam. African people often combine the practice of their traditional belief with the practice of Abrahamic religions.Although a large proportion of Africans have converted to Islam an Christianity, these two world religions have been assimilated into African culture, and many African Christians and Muslims maintain traditional spiritual beliefst doesn't seem to be an either-or for many people. They can describe themselves primarily as Muslim or Christian and continue to practice many of the traditions that are characteristic of African traditional religion," Luis Lugo, executive director of the Pew Forum, told AFP. Abrahamic religions are widespread throughout Africa. They have both spread and replaced indigenous African religions, but are often adapted to African cultural contexts and belief systems. The World Book Encyclopedia has estimated that in 2002 Christians formed 45% of the continent's population, with Muslims forming 40%. It was also estimated in 2002 that Christians form 45% of Africa's population, with Muslims forming 40.6%.

Christianity

Christianity is now one of the most widely practiced religions in Africa along with Islam and is the largest religion in Sub-Saharan Africa. Several syncretistic and messianic sects have formed throughout much of the continent, including the Nazareth Baptist Church in South Africa and the Aladura churches in Nigeria. There is also fairly widespread populations of Seventh-day Adventists and Jehovah's Witnesses. The oldest Christian denominations in Africa are the Eastern Orthodox Church of Alexandria, the Coptic Orthodox Church of Alexandria, and the Ethiopian Orthodox Tewahedo Church and Eritrean Orthodox Tewahedo Church (which rose to prominence in the fourth century AD after King Ezana the Great made Ethiopia one of the first Christian nations.)

In the first few centuries of Christianity, Africa produced many figures who had a major influence outside the continent, including St Augustine of Hippo, St Maurice, Origen, Tertullian, and three Roman Catholic popes (Victor I, Miltiades and Gelasius I), as well as the Biblical characters Simon of Cyrene and the Ethiopian eunuch baptised by Philip the Evangelist. Christianity existed in Ethiopia before the rule of King Ezana the Great of the Kingdom of Axum, but the religion grasped a strong foothold when it was declared a state religion in 330 AD, becoming one of the first Christian nations.

The earliest and best known reference to the introduction of Christianity to Africa is mentioned in the Christian Bible's Acts of the Apostles, and pertains to the evangelist Phillip's conversion of an Ethiopian traveller in the 1st century AD. Although the Bible refers to them as Ethiopians, scholars have argued that Ethiopia was a common term encompassing the area South-Southeast of Egypt.

Other traditions have the convert as a Jew who was a steward in the Queen's court. All accounts do agree on the fact that the traveller was a member of the royal court who successfully succeeded in converting the Queen, which in turn caused a church to be built. Tyrannius Rufinus, a noted church historian, also recorded a personal account as do other church historians such as Socrates and Sozemius.

Some experts predict the shift of Christianity's center from the European industrialized nations to Africa and Asia in modern times. Yale University historian Lamin Sanneh stated, that "African Christianity was not just an exotic, curious phenomenon in an obscure part of the world, but that African Christianity might be the shape of things to come." The statistics from the World Christian Encyclopedia (David Barrett) illustrate the emerging trend of dramatic Christian growth on the continent and supposes, that in 2025 there will be 633 million Christians in Africa.

A 2015 study estimates 2,161,000 Christian believers from a Muslim background in Africa, most of them belonging to some form of Protestantism.

Islam

Islam is the other major religion in Africa alongside Christianity, with 45% of the population being Muslim, accounting for 1/4 of the world's Muslim population. The faith's historic roots on the continent stem from the time of the Prophet Muhammad, whose early disciples migrated to Abyssinia (hijira) in fear of persecution from the pagan Arabs.

The spread of Islam in North Africa came with the expansion of Arab empire under Caliph Umar, through the Sinai Peninsula. The spread of Islam in West Africa was through Islamic traders and sailors. The religion had also began influencing Harla Kingdom in the Horn of Africa early on.

Islam is the dominant religion in North Africa and the Horn of Africa. It has also become the predominant religion on the Swahili Coast as well as the West African seaboard and parts of the interior. There have been several Muslim empires in Western Africa which exerted considerable influence, notably the Mali Empire, which flourished for several centuries and the Songhai Empire, under the leadership of Mansa Musa, Sunni Ali and Askia Mohammed.

The vast majority of Muslims in Africa are followers of Sunni Islam. There are also small minorities of other sects.Blitt, Robert C. "Springtime for Freedom of Religion or Belief: Will Newly Democratic Arab States Guarantee International Human Rights Norms or Perpetuate Their Violation?." State Responses to Minority Religions. Routledge, 2017. 45-64.

Judaism

Adherents of Judaism can be found scattered in a number of countries across Africa; including North Africa, Ethiopia, Uganda, Kenya, Cameroon, Gabon, Ghana, Ivory Coast, Sierra Leone, Nigeria and Southern Africa.

Baháʼí Faith

The Baháʼí Faith in Africa has a diverse history. It especially had wide-scale growth in the 1950s which extended further in the 1960s. The Association of Religion Data Archives (relying on World Christian Encyclopedia) lists many large and smaller populations of Baháʼís in Africa with Kenya (#3: 512,900), the Democratic Republic of the Congo (#5: 282,900), South Africa (#8: 238,500) and Zambia (#10: 190,400) among the top ten numerical populations of Baháʼís in the world in 2010, and Mauritius (#4: 1.8% of population) joining Zambia (#3: 1.8%) and Kenya (#10: 1.0%) in the top ten in terms of percentage of the national population.

All three individual heads of the religion, Bahá'u'lláh, `Abdu'l-Bahá, and Shoghi Effendi, were in Africa at various times. More recently the roughly 2000 Baháʼís of Egypt have been embroiled in the Egyptian identification card controversy from 2006 through 2009. Since then there have been homes burned down and families driven out of towns. On the other hand, Sub-Saharan Baháʼís were able to mobilize for nine regional conferences called for by the Universal House of Justice 20 October 2008 to celebrate recent achievements in grassroots community-building and to plan their next steps in organizing in their home areas.

Hinduism

Hinduism has existed in Africa mainly since the late 19th century. There are an estimated 2-2.5 million adherents of Hinduism in Africa. It is the largest religion in Mauritius, and several other countries have Hindu temples.
Hindus came to South Africa as indentured laborers in the 19th century. The young M.K. Gandhi lived and worked among the Indian community in South Africa for twenty years before returning to India to participate in India's freedom movement.

Buddhism and folk religions

Buddhism is a tiny religion in Africa with around 250,000 practicing adherents, and up to nearly 400,000 if combined with Taoism and Chinese Folk Religion as a common traditional religion of mostly new Chinese migrants (significant minority in Mauritius, Réunion, and South Africa). About half of African Buddhists are now living in South Africa, while Mauritius has the highest Buddhist percentage in the continent, between 1.5% to 2% of the total population.

Other religions
Other faiths are practiced in Africa, including Sikhism, Jainism, Zoroastrianism and Rastafari among others.

Irreligion

A Gallup poll found that the irreligious comprise 20% in South Africa, 16% in Botswana, 13% in Mozambique, 13% in Togo, 12% in Ivory Coast, 10% in Ethiopia and Angola, 9% in Sudan, Zimbabwe and Algeria, 8% in Namibia and 7% in Madagascar.

Syncretism
Syncretism is the combining of different (often contradictory) beliefs, often while melding practices of various schools of thought. In the commonwealth of Africa syncretism with indigenous beliefs is practiced throughout the region. It is believed by some to explain religious tolerance between different groups. Kwesi Yankah and John Mbiti argue that many African peoples today have a 'mixed' religious heritage to try to reconcile traditional religions with Abrahamic faiths.

Jesse Mugambi claims that the Christianity taught to Africans by missionaries had a fear of syncretism, which was carried on by current African Christian leadership in an attempt to keep Christianity "pure." Syncretism in Africa is said by others to be overstated, and due to a misunderstanding of the abilities of local populations to form their own orthodoxies and also confusion over what is culture and what is religion. Others state that the term syncretism is a vague one, since it can be applied to refer to substitution or modification of the central elements of Christianity or Islam with beliefs or practices from somewhere else.

The consequences under this definition, according to missiologist Keith Ferdinando, are a fatal compromise of the religion's integrity. However, communities in Africa (e.g. Afro-Asiatic) have many common practices which are also found in Abrahamic faiths, and thus these traditions do not fall under the category of some definitions of syncretism.

Religious distribution

 The most recent census data are used.

See also

Major religious groups
Religion in Asia
Religion in Europe
Religion in Oceania
Religion in North America
Religion in South America

References

Further reading
 Bongmba, Elias Kifon, ed. The Wiley-Blackwell Companion to African Religions (2012) excerpt
 Engel, Elisabeth. Encountering Empire: African American Missionaries in Colonial Africa, 1900–1939 (Stuttgart: Franz Steiner, 2015). 303 pp. 
 Mbiti, John S. Introduction to African religion (2nd ed. 1991) excerpt
 Olupona, Jacob K. African Religions: A Very Short Introduction (2014) excerpt
 Parrinder, Geoffrey. African Traditional Religion. (3rd ed. London: Sheldon Press, 1974)  
 Parinder, E. Geoffrey. Africa's Three Religions. (2nd ed. London: Sheldon Press, 1976). The three religions are traditional religions (grouped), Christianity, and Islam. 
 Ray, Benjamin C. African Religions: Symbol, Ritual, and Community'' (2nd ed. 1999)

External links
African Beliefs
"African Traditional Religion" in "The Story of Africa" from the BBC World Service
Text of Atoms and Ancestors, considered a classic study
Stanford Page
African Religions at Africa Missions Resource Center
Tutelary deities of the Akan people of West Africa

 

pl:Religie rodzime Afryki